The Human Condition I: No Greater Love (第一部 純愛篇／第二部 激怒篇) is a 1959 Japanese epic war drama film directed by Masaki Kobayashi. It is the first part of The Human Condition trilogy.

Plot 
In World War II-era Japan, Kaji marries his sweetheart Michiko despite his misgivings about the future. To gain exemption from military service, he moves his wife to a large mining operation in Japanese-colonized Manchuria, where he serves as a labor chief assigned to a workforce of Chinese prisoners.

Kaji aggravates the camp bureaucracy by implementing humane practices to improve both labor conditions and productivity, clashing with foremen, administrators, and the Kenpeitai military police. Ultimately his efforts to grant autonomy to the POWs are undermined by scheming officials, resulting in the electrocution of several prisoners and the beheading of others accused of attempted escape. When Kaji protests the brutality, he is tortured and then drafted into the army to relieve the camp supervisors of his disruptive presence.

Cast 
 Tatsuya Nakadai as Kaji
 Michiyo Aratama as Michiko
 Chikage Awashima as Tōfuku Kin
 Ineko Arima as Shunran Yō
 Sō Yamamura as Okishima
 Keiji Sada as Kageyama
 Kōji Nanbara as Kao (as Shinji Nanbara)
 Akira Ishihama as Chen
 Kōji Mitsui as Furuya
 Seiji Miyaguchi as Wang Heng Li
 Eitaro Ozawa as Okazaki
 Toru Abe as Sergeant Watai
 Junkichi Orimoto as Sai
 Masao Mishima as Manager Kuroki
 Kyū Sazanka as Cho Meisan

References 

1959 films
Films directed by Masaki Kobayashi
Japanese war drama films
Films with screenplays by Masaki Kobayashi
1950s Japanese-language films
1950s Japanese films